Tri.be Da Loca (stylized as TRI.BE Da Loca) is the debut single album of the South Korean girl group Tri.be. The album was released on 17 February 2021 by TR Entertainment and distributed by Universal Music Group and Republic Records. The single album consists of two tracks which are produced by Shinsadong Tiger and LE.

Background and composition 
On 1 February, 2022, TR Entertainment announced Tri.be will be making their debut at the end of February. On the same day, the title was revealed to be "Doom Doom Ta". After several teasers were released, the album was released on February 17.

The two-track album features the lead single "Doom Doom Ta" as well as the hip-hop and synth-pop B-side "Loca" and both tracks are about "living independently without caring about what others think", written by Shinsadong Tiger and LE from the girl group EXID. It is primarily a pop record with afrobeat, baile funk and dancehall elements.

Promotion 
A press showcase was held at Blue Square Hall in Hannam-dong, and was streamed live on V Live. On the same day of the debut, they signed a contract with Republic Records, a subsidiary label of Universal Music Group, for future international promotions. On February 18, 2021, the group made the debut performance of "Doom Doom Ta" on M Countdown. On February 19, the group performed on Music Bank. On February 20, they performed on Show! Music Core. On February 21, Tri.be performed on Inkigayo and continued to perform on other South Korean music programs as well.

Commercial performance 
Tri.be Da Loca peaked at number 57 on Gaon Album Chart. The title track was able to peak at number 76 on the component download chart.  After several hours of tracking, "Doom Doom Ta" charted on South Korea's and China's major domestic music sites such as Bugs! and QQ Music.

Track listing

Credits and personnel 
Credits are adopted from MelOn.

Studios 

 821 Sound – recording, mastering

 Klang Studio – mixing

Personnel 
 TR Entertainment – executive production
 Universal Music – executive production
 LE – lyrics, composing
 Shinsadong Tiger – composing, lyrics, arranging
 Kim Min-hee  – recording
 Koo Jung-pil  – mixing
 Jang Yu-ra – mixing
 Kwon Nam-woo – mastering

Accolades

Charts

Release history

References 

Single albums
2021 debut albums
Korean-language albums
Universal Music Group EPs
Republic Records EPs